Schwanke is a German surname. Notable people with the surname include:

 Carlos Schwanke (born 1974), Brazilian volleyball player
 Jörg Schwanke (born 1969), German football player and coach

German-language surnames